Yoshimasa is a masculine Japanese given name.

Possible writings
Yoshimasa can be written using many different combinations of kanji characters. Here are some examples: 

義正, "justice, righteous"
義政, "justice, politics"
義昌, "justice, clear"
佳正, "skilled, righteous"
佳政, "skilled, politics"
佳雅, "skilled, elegant"
善正, "virtuous, righteous"
善政, "virtuous, politics"
善真, "virtuous, reality"
吉正, "good luck, righteous"
吉政, "good luck, politics"
吉真, "good luck, reality"
良正, "good, righteous"
良政, "good, politics"
良昌, "good, clear"
恭正, "respectful, righteous"
嘉正, "excellent, righteous"
嘉政, "excellent, politics"
能政, "capacity, politics"
喜政, "rejoice, politics"

The name can also be written in hiragana よしまさ or katakana ヨシマサ.

Notable people with the name
, Japanese shōgun
, Japanese footballer
, Japanese politician
, Japanese woodworker
, Japanese anime director
, Japanese voice actor
, Japanese artist
, Japanese samurai
, Japanese actor
, Japanese general
, Japanese footballer
, Japanese sumo wrestler
, Japanese rally driver

Japanese masculine given names